Gérard Devos (19 August 1903, Sint-Andries – 5 January 1972, Tielt) was a Belgian football striker.

Career
Devos started playing football with Cercle Brugge. He made his debut in a 5–1 loss against Standard Liège on 23 October 1921. He played most of his career for the green and black side. He was 7 times the team's top goal scorer, and he also has the 8th most goals in the history of Cercle.

Devos won the league title with Cercle in 1927. His last match with Cercle was against Antwerp FC on 3 November 1929. Cercle lost 1–4. Devos ended his career with FC Eeklo, where he would also become manager.

Devos appeared 9 times in the colours of Belgium. He was capped for the first time against France on 11 April 1926. Belgium lost 4–3. Devos made one of the three Belgian goals. He was also called up for Belgium at the 1928 Summer Olympics.

References

External links
 Cerclemuseum.be 
 

1903 births
1972 deaths
Footballers from Bruges
Belgian footballers
Association football forwards
Belgium international footballers
Cercle Brugge K.S.V. players
Belgian Pro League players
Belgian football managers
Olympic footballers of Belgium
Footballers at the 1928 Summer Olympics